Francis Takyi Atuahene (born 8 June 1996) is a Ghanaian footballer.

Career

Youth & College
Atuahene played three years of college soccer at the University of Michigan between 2015 and 2017. He left college a year early to sign a Generation Adidas contract with Major League Soccer ahead of the MLS SuperDraft.

While at college, Atuahene played with USL PDL side Michigan Bucks in 2017.

Before college, he attended The Hotchkiss School where he starred for four years, also running track during the spring season. There, he won a New England Championship as a freshman.

Professional 
On 19 January 2018, Atuahene was selected 4th overall in the 2018 MLS SuperDraft by FC Dallas, who traded $200,000 of General Allocation Money to Montreal Impact for the SuperDraft pick.

On 2 March 2018, he was loaned to United Soccer League side Oklahoma City Energy. He made his debut on 17 March 2018, scoring the only goal in a 1–0 win over Tulsa Roughnecks.

Atuahene made his debut for FC Dallas on 8 June 2019 in a 2–2 draw against the San Jose Earthquakes in which he scored the equalizing goal 42 seconds into his debut.

On 12 June 2019, Atuahene joined USL Championship side Austin Bold FC on loan until the end of the season.

Atuahene was released by Dallas following their 2020 season.

On 21 April 2021, Atuahene signed with USL Championship side Memphis 901.

Atuahene signed with Detroit City FC on March 3, 2022. He left Detroit following their 2022 season.

References

External links 
 Michigan Wolverines Profile
 
 
 

1996 births
Living people
Association football forwards
Austin Bold FC players
Expatriate soccer players in the United States
FC Dallas draft picks
FC Dallas players
Ghanaian footballers
Ghanaian expatriate footballers
Flint City Bucks players
Memphis 901 FC players
Detroit City FC players
Michigan Wolverines men's soccer players
OKC Energy FC players
San Diego Loyal SC players
Soccer players from Connecticut
Footballers from Accra
USL Championship players
USL League Two players
Major League Soccer players